Hridesh Rajan is an American computer scientist. He was elected a fellow of the American Association for the Advancement of Science for "distinguished contributions to data driven science, particularly to modularity and modular reasoning in computer software and the development of the Boa language and infrastructure."

Early life and education
Rajan completed his Bachelor of Technology in computer science and engineering from the Indian Institute of Technology before moving to North America and enrolling at the University of Virginia for his graduate studies. He wrote his dissertation, "Unifying Aspect and Object-Oriented Program Design," under the guidance of Kevin J. Sullivan.

Career
Following his PhD, Rajan joined the Department of Computer Science faculty at Iowa State University as an assistant professor in 2005.  In this role, he developed programming language designs to enable improved modularity for complex software systems to reduce defects and to improve software quality. As a result, Rajan received a 2009 National Science Foundation CAREER Award (NSF) for his project "Mutualism of Modularity and Concurrency Goals." The following year, he won another NSF award to improve modularization and reasoning mechanisms for Aspect-oriented programming languages. Upon his promotion to associate professor, Rajan was awarded multiple grants from the NSF to improve multicore programming.

By 2017, Rajan was appointed the Kingland Professor of Data Analytics and named an Association for Computing Machinery (ACM) Distinguished Member. The following year, Rajan was awarded a 2018-19 Fulbright U.S. Scholar Award from the  J. William Fulbright Foreign Scholarship Board.

During the COVID-19 pandemic, Rajan co-developed a data science infrastructure to improve research efficiencies for scientists who study the novel coronavirus. The tool enables scientists to quickly and efficiently locate, navigate and analyze coronavirus research from all over the world. He was also awarded a $1.5 million grant from the National Science Foundation to develop and eventually establish the Dependable Data-Driven Discovery Institute at Iowa State University. In June 2020, Rajan was selected to receive a Facebook Probability and Programming Award for his project "Manas: Big Code Assisted Neural Architecture Search." A few months later, his co-authored paper "On Decomposing a Deep Neural Network into Modules" was awarded the ACM SIGSOFT Distinguished Paper Award.

In November 2020, Rajan was appointed chair of the Department of Computer Science, removing his interim title. He was also elected a fellow of the American Association for the Advancement of Science for "distinguished contributions to data driven science, particularly to modularity and modular reasoning in computer software and the development of the Boa language and infrastructure." The following year, Rajan served as the general chair for the 2021 ACM SIGPLAN conference SPLASH (Systems, Programming, Languages, and Applications: Software for Humanity).

Books
 An Experiential Introduction to Principles of Programming Languages (2022)

References

External links

Living people
American computer scientists
Indian Institutes of Technology alumni
Iowa State University faculty
University of Virginia School of Engineering and Applied Science alumni
Fellows of the American Association for the Advancement of Science
Year of birth missing (living people)